Kahit Demonyo Itutumba Ko is a 2000 Filipino action film starring Rommel Padilla, Jean Garcia and Vic Diaz.

Plot
A soldier (Rommel Padilla) is among a unit who attacked and destroyed a rebel base, capturing a rebel returnee (Jean Garcia), which he fell in love. He later quits his job and settles in with the rebel returnee.

A Chinese man (Vic Diaz) and his mercenaries runs a drug syndicate, which clashes with his belief. He later fights the syndicate.

Cast
 Rommel Padilla
 Jean Garcia
 Paquito Diaz
 Romy Diaz as Chinese man
 Bob Soler
 Vic Diaz

External links
 

Philippine action films